Parapercis punctata is a fish species in the sandperch family, Pinguipedidae. It is found in the Western Indian Ocean.

References

Ho, H. C., 2013. Redescription of Parapercis punctata (Cuvier, 1829) and status of Neosillago Castelnau, 1875 and its type species Neosillago marmorata Castelnau, 1875 (Perciformes: Pinguipedidae). Zootaxa 3736(3):291-299.

Pinguipedidae
Taxa named by Georges Cuvier
Fish described in 1829
Fish of the Indian Ocean